The Women's Baltic Football League is an international women's football confronting the two top teams in Estonia's Meistriliiga, Latvia's Sieviešu Ligas and Lithuania's A Lyga within a round robin format, with no fixtures between both teams from each country. It was first played in 2017, from June to September.

The tournament was also held in 2006–2008 with different rules.

Palmares

Results

2017

2018

Final four

Semi-finals (2018-10-26; Radviliškis; Šiauliai)

FC Minsk 8–0 Pärnu JK

Gintra 3–0 Flora 

3rd-place (2018-10-28; Radviliškis)

Flora 3–2 Pärnu JK

Final (2018-10-28; Šiauliai)

Gintra 1–2 FC Minsk

2019

2022

See also
 Baltic League
 Women's Baltic Cup
 Baltic Women's Basketball League

References

Baltic League
Sports leagues established in 2017
Summer association football leagues
Sport in the Baltic states
Baltic Football League
Baltic League
Baltic League
Baltic League
Sports leagues established in 2006
Multi-national professional sports leagues